Vance Bluff is a small ice-covered eminence near the polar plateau, 10 nautical miles (18 km) north of Laird Plateau. Its flat summit merges with the ice sheet to the north and west, but there is a steep cliff along the south side. Black Icefalls run northeast from Vance Bluff to Mount Massam. It was named by the Advisory Committee on Antarctic Names (US-ACAN) for the USS Vance, an ocean station ship in support of aircraft flights between New Zealand and McMurdo Sound during U.S. Navy Operation Deepfreeze 1962.

Cliffs of Oates Land